Doesburgia celebiana is a species of beetle in the family Cerambycidae, and the only species in the genus Doesburgia. It was described by Tippmann in 1953. It was named after the Dutch town of Doesburg.

References

Batocerini
Beetles described in 1953
Monotypic Cerambycidae genera